Lavrentiya Airport  is an airport in Chukotsky District, Chukotka Autonomous Okrug, Russia, located   south of Lavrentiya.  It consists of a small airstrip with a tarmac. It is the easternmost airport of continental Asia, the easternmost airport on continental earth.

Airlines and destinations

References
RussianAirFields.com

External links
Lavrentiya airport photo gallery

Airports built in the Soviet Union
Airports in Chukotka Autonomous Okrug